The 1925 Pacific Coast Conference football season was the 11th season of college football played by the member schools of the Pacific Coast Conference (PCC) and was a part of the 1925 college football season. 

The 1925 Washington Huskies football team, led by head coach Enoch Bagshaw, won the conference championship with a 10–1–1 overall record (5–0 against PCC opponents). The Huskies were undefeated in the regular season but lost to national champion Alabama by a 20–19 score in the 1926 Rose Bowl. Washington's backfield star Wildcat Wilson was a consensus pick for the 1925 All-America team. Other key players included quarterback George Guttormsen and fullback Elmer Tesreau. The Huskies led the PCC in scoring with an average of 40.0 points per game.

The 1925 Stanford football team, led by head coach Pop Warner, finished in second place with a 7–2 overall record (4–1 against PCC opponents).  Stanford's fullback Ernie Nevers was a consensus first-team All-American. Other key players included end Ted Shipkey and guard Fred H. Swan.

The 1925 USC Trojans football team, led by first-year head coach Howard Jones, tied for third place with an 11–2 overall record (3–2 against PCC opponents). The Trojans led the PCC in scoring defense, allowing only an average of only 4.2 points per game. Key players for USC included quarterback Morley Drury, guard Brice Taylor, center Jeff Cravath, and end Hobbs Adams.

The 1925 Oregon Agricultural Aggies football team, led by head coach, Paul J. Schissler, tied with USC for third place.  The Aggies compiled a 7–2 overall record (3–2 against PCC opponents). Key players included halfback Wes Schulmerich and tackles Lewis "Hip" Dickerson and Jim Dixon.

Season overview

Results and team statistics

Key
PPG = Average of points scored per game
PAG = Average of points allowed per game

Regular season

September 26
On September 26, four PCC teams opened their seasons with five non-conference games. USC played a double-header.  The five games resulted in four victories and one loss. The loss was sustained by Stanford against San Francisco's strong Olympic Club team.

October 2-3
Over the weekend of October 2-3, the nine PCC teams played nine games, with Washington hosting a double-header.  Only one intra-conference game was played. In eight non-conference games, the PCC compiled a record of seven wins, no losses, and one tie. The tie game was played between Oregon and the Multnomah Athletic Club of Portland.

October 9-10
Over the weekend of October 9-10, the PCC teams played two intra-conference games and four non-conference games. Washington State did not play a game. The non-conference games resulted in three wins and one loss. The loss was sustained by California against the same Olympic Club team that defeated Stanford two weeks earlier.

October 17
On October 17, the PCC teams played two intra-conference games and five non-conference games. The non-conference games resulted in three wins, no losses, and two ties. Washington and Nebraska played to a 6–6 tie, the only blemish on Washington's undefeated regular season. Stanford established itself in second place with a road victory over USC. California and Saint Mary's also played to a 6–6 tie.

October 24
On October 24, the PCC teams played two intra-conference games and four non-conference games. Washington State did not play a game. The non-conference games resulted in three wins and one loss. Stanford defeated Oregon Agricultural to further establish itself in second place in the conference. The non-conference loss was sustained by Idaho in a road game against Gonzaga.

October 30-31
Over the weekend of October 30-31, PCC teams played four intra-conference games and one non-conference game.

November 7
On November 7, PCC teams played three intra-conference games and two-non-conference games. Oregon did not play a game. Washington defeated Stanford in a game that decided the conference championship. The two non-conference games resulted in victories.

November 14
On November 14, PCC teams played three intra-conference games and one non-conference game. Idaho and Washington State did not play games. In the non-conference game Stanford defeated the Southern Branch of the University of California (later renamed UCLA).

November 21
On November 21, the conference teams played two intra-conference games and three non-conference games. Montana and Oregon did not play games. In the annual Big Game, Stanford defeated California, 26–14, before a crowd of 74,000, the largest crowd to attend a PCC game in 1925. The non-conference games resulted in two victories and one tie. USC defeated Big Ten opponent Iowa, 18–0. Washington State and Gonzaga played to a scoreless tie.

November 26-28

December 5

December 12

Post-season games

All-Pacific Coast players

The following players were selected by the United Press as first-team players on the 1925 All-Big Ten Conference football team. 
 Bill Kelly, quarterback, Montana (College Football Hall of Fame)
 Morley Drury, halfback, USC
 Wildcat Wilson, halfback, Washington (College Football Hall of Fame)
 Ernie Nevers, fullback, Stanford (College and Pro Football Halls of Fame)
 Ted Shipkey, end, Stanford 
 Hobbs Adams, end, USC 
 Walden Erickson, tackle, Washington
 Jim Dixon, tackle, Oregon Aggies 
 Dana Carey, guard, California
 Brice Taylor, guard, USC
 Jeff Cravath, center, USC

All-Americans

Two PCC players were consensus first-team selections to the 1925 College Football All-America Team:
 Ernie Nevers of Stanford at back
 Wildcat Wilson of Washington at back

Other PCC players receiving first-team honors from at least one official selector included:
 Brice Taylor of USC at guard (by the Football Writers Association of America)
 Dana Carey of California at guard (by Liberty magazine)

References